As Hell Retreats is an American Christian metal band from Hendersonville, Tennessee. The band started making music in 2005, and their membership was lead vocalist, Jackson Greene, lead guitarists, Clint Clayton, Blake Hardman, and Tyler Riley, bass guitarists, Nate Landreth, Seth Steele, and Taylor Jones, and drummer, Trent Davenport. The band released two independently made extended plays, Demo, in 2007, and, Acknowledgement, in 2008. Their first studio album, Revival, was released by Strike First Records, in 2010. The subsequent studio album, Volition, was released by Ain't No Grave Records, in 2011.

Background
As Hell Retreats is a Christian metal band from Hendersonville, Tennessee. Their members are lead vocalist, Jackson Greene, lead guitarists, Clint Clayton, Blake Hardman, and Tyler Riley, bass guitarists, Nate Landreth and Taylor Jones, and drummer, Trent Davenport.

Music history
The band commenced as a musical entity in 2005, with their first release, Demo, an extended play, that was released independently in 2007. They release another extended play, Acknowledgement, in 2008, also independently. Their first studio album, Revival, was released by Strike First Records on May 25, 2010. The subsequent studio album, Volition, was released by Ain't No Grave Records on July 26, 2011. This was their final release, as they disbanded in 2012.

Members
Last Known Line-up
 Taylor Jones - bass (2009-2011, 2012)
 Tyler Riley (currently with Gideon) - guitar (2008-2012)
 Jackson Greene - lead vocals (2007-2012), bass (2005-2007)
 Trent Davenport - drums (2005-2012)
 Drew Creal - guitar (2012)
Past members
 Clint Clayton - lead guitar (2005-2007) (2008)
 Blake Hardman (ex-Gideon, ex-Hundredth) - lead guitar (2007-2010)
 Nate Landreth - bass (2007-2009)
 N.L Carey - vocals (2005-2007)
 Joshua Nance - drums (Injury Replacement)
 Shibby Poole (currently with Yautja) - guitar (2006-2008)
 Seth Steele - bass (2009)
 Cameron Lindmark - guitar (2007-2008)
Timeline

Discography
Studio albums
 Revival (May 25, 2010, Strike First)
 Volition (July 26, 2011, Ain't No Grave)
EPs
 Demo (2007, Independent)
 Acknowledgement (2007, Independent)

References

External links
Cross Rhythms artist profile

Heavy metal musical groups from Tennessee
2005 establishments in Tennessee
2012 disestablishments in Tennessee
Musical groups established in 2005
Musical groups disestablished in 2012
Facedown Records artists
Strike First Records artists